The Forth Corinthian Yacht Club is located in Granton, in Edinburgh, Scotland, on a site overlooking the Firth of Forth

History

In 1880, several gentlemen met in a room at the Granton Hotel (now ) and formed the Forth Corinthian Yacht Club.

The hotel was designed by the architect William Burn in 1838 and is situated in Granton Square. Granton was very much the creation of the 5th Duke of Buccleuch, based around the harbour whose main function was the export of coal from the Duke's mines in the Lothians.

Ethos
The Forth Corinthian Yacht Club is about amateur sailors coming together to make sailing affordable for all. Wherever possible, members contribute their own skills  and labour to the work of the club and the experience of long-standing members is shared with new members and beginners.

References

External links 
 

Granton, Edinburgh
Yacht clubs in Scotland
1880 establishments in Scotland
Sports clubs established in 1880
Sports teams in Edinburgh